Yakup Gör (born November 10, 1988 in Erzurum, Turkey) is a Turkish freestyle wrestler competing in the 66 kg division. He is a member of the İstanbul Büyükşehir Belediyesi S.K.

He began with wrestling in his hometown Erzurum, where he was instructed and coached at the city wrestling training center. Before he transferred to Istanbul BB SK, Gör competed for the Erzurum Büyükşehir Belediyesi Sk.

Achievements
He became bronze medalist at the 2010 Mediterranean Championships on May 7 in Istanbul, Turkey.

Gör shared the bronze medal with his national teammate Muhammed İlhan at the FILA Golden Grand Prix held on July 8–10, 2011 in Baku, Azerbaijan.

He captured the gold medal at the Men's Wrestling FILA Freestyle World Cup 2013 held on February 21–22 in Tehran, Iran.

Yakup Gör won the silver medal at the 2013 European Wrestling Championships held in Tbilisi, Georgia.

References

External links
 

1988 births
Sportspeople from Erzurum
Living people
Istanbul Büyükşehir Belediyespor athletes
European Games medalists in wrestling
Wrestlers at the 2015 European Games
European Games bronze medalists for Turkey
World Wrestling Championships medalists
Turkish male sport wrestlers
European Wrestling Championships medalists
20th-century Turkish people
21st-century Turkish people